Miejski Klub Piłkarski Pogoń Siedlce  is a Polish football club based in Siedlce.

The football team is currently playing in II liga. Pogoń plays their home games at new Municipal Stadium, which is situated on John Paul II Road in the town.

History
The club was founded in 1944 as Ognisko Siedlce after Nazi Germany's occupation of Siedlce had ended. Before the World War II, several football clubs existed in Siedlce, including Strzelec Siedlce and WKS 22. pp Siedlce, a military club having played in the Polish League from 1932 to 1934.
In 1949, Ognisko was relegated from II liga.
Through many years, the club had played in the regional leagues and even in III liga as Kolejarz (Railwayman) Siedlce, Start-Pogoń Siedlce and later as MKS Pogoń Siedlce. From 1991 to 1997 they played in III liga, and later in lower leagues again. In 2008 they were renamed to MKP Pogoń Siedlce and have gained promotion to III liga (fourth league level) in 2009 and later to II liga in 2011.
In June 2014, they secured promotion to I liga.
In 2018 Pogoń was relegated to II liga after having lost play-off.
Sources:

Current squad

Out on loan

References

External links
 Official website 
 Pogoń Siedlce at 90minut.pl 

 
Football clubs in Masovian Voivodeship
Association football clubs established in 1944
Siedlce
1944 establishments in Poland